The Bay Garden was developed by horticulturalists Frances and Iain MacDonald using the remnants of a neglected 18th century farmhouse, an old orchard and various other outer areas. It is located in Camolin, County Wexford, in the Republic of Ireland. The Garden is a registered member of the Wexford Garden Trail. In August 2020, The Bay Garden was put up for sale.

History 
The MacDonalds purchased the two acres of land in 1989, believing it would take a decade to transform into the Bay Garden with 10 unique ‘rooms.’ The endeavour was  completed in 2014.  The gardens are: Barn Garden, Bog Garden, Cottage Garden, Funereal Border, Hot Border, Pool Garden, Rose Garden, Serpentine Garden and Woodland Garden. The Jardin Sheila was constructed in 2014.

Gardens

Barn Garden 
This is planted in a prairie style and features Calamagrostis Carl Foerster,  Overdam, Stipa tenuissima and Miscanthus sinensis Ferne Osten, the Sanguisorba Tanna's Seedling and sedums.

Funereal Border 
This is a rather sinister area with black plants including the Physocarpus opulifolius Diabolo, Pittisporum tenufolium Nigricans.

Hot Border 
This contains red and yellow flowers including: crocosmias, dahlias and day lilies along with green and plum foliage plants.

Pool Garden 
Here there are blue, silver and white campanula, wormwood and other plants.

Rose Garden 
This is most noted for its remoteness.  It features shrub roses, a Thuja plicata hedge, a cruciform and scrupulously clipped box.

Serpentine Garden 
The back row has the: Cornus alternifolia Argentia, Parrottia persica shrubs.  The front is adorned with the Dierama igneum and Perovskia Blue Spire. There is also the Vitis vinifera purpurea, the C‘Perle d’Or’.

Woodland Garden 
This features the parrotia hedge which has a shelter and place to sit that is very popular among visitors pausing for a rest.

Visitors 
The Bay Garden is open every Sunday during the summer (May -September) and every Friday (June to August).  Visitors can enjoy talks from Frances MacDonald, intriguing design and colour combinations and more.

References

Buildings and structures in the Republic of Ireland
Woodland gardens
Gardens in County Wexford